Jean-Pierre is a French male given name (in English "John-Peter"). It may refer to:

 Jean-Pierre Aumont (1911–2001), a French actor
 Jean-Pierre Bemba (b. 1962), a Congolese politician and rebel leader
 Jean-Pierre Blanchard (1753–1809), a French inventor and aviation pioneer
 Jean-Pierre Cassel (1932–2007), a French actor
 Jean-Pierre Changeux (b. 1936), a French neuroscientist
 Jean-Pierre Chevènement (b. 1939), a French politician
 Jean-Pierre Claris de Florian (1755–1794), a French poet and romance writer
 Jean-Pierre Corteggiani (b. 1942), a French Egyptologist
 Jean-Pierre Côté (1926–2002), a Canadian politician
 Jean-Pierre Dardenne (b. 1951), one of the Dardenne brothers filmmaking duo
 Jean-Pierre Demailly (1957–2022), a French mathematician
 Jean-Pierre Elkabbach (b. 1937), a French journalist
 Jean Pierre Flourens (1794–1867), a French physiologist and pioneer in anesthesia
 Jean-Pierre Foucault (b. 1947), a French television host
 Jean-Pierre Gorin, (b. 1943), a French filmmaker and professor
 Jean-Pierre Haigneré (b. 1948), a French astronaut
 Jean-Pierre Houdin (b. 1951), a French architect
 Jean-Pierre Jeunet (b. 1953), a French film director
 Jean-Pierre Léaud (b. 1944), a French actor
 Jean-Pierre Mader (b. 1955), a French singer-songwriter
 Jean-Pierre Melville (1917–1973), a French film director
 Jean-Pierre Papin (b. 1963), a French football player and manager 
 Jean-Pierre Raffarin (b. 1948), a French politician
 Jean-Pierre Rampal (1922–2000), a French flautist
 Jean-Pierre Richard (b. 1922), a French writer and literary critic
 Jean-Pierre Serre (b. 1926), a French mathematician
 Jean-Pierre Thiollet (b. 1956), a French writer
 Jean-Pierre Tokoto (b. 1993), American basketball player for Hapoel Tel Aviv of the Israeli Basketball Premier League
 Jean-Pierre Verdet (b. 1932), a French astronomer and historian of astronomy
 Jean-Pierre Vernant (1914–2007), a French historian and anthropologist
Jean-Pierre Vigier (b. 1969), French politician
Jean-Pierre Vigier (1920–2004), French physicist
 Jean Pierre (Rwandan informant), an anonymous Rwandan informant to Roméo Dallaire in the run-up to the 1994 Rwandan Genocide

Fictional characters bearing the name include:
 Jean-Pierre (Metalocalypse character), the chef in American animated television series "Metalocalypse"
 Jean-Pierre Delmas, the father of Elisabeth Delmas and headmaster of Kadic Junior High School in the French animated television series Code Lyoko
 Jean Pierre, a character in Fighter's History
 Jean-Pierre Polnareff (1994), the French crusader possessing Silver Chariot in JoJo's Bizarre Adventure: Stardust Crusaders
 Jean Pierre Colored Pencils the 12th, the first member of the Legion of Stationery in Paper Mario: The Origami King, and the second major boss of said game.
 Jean-Pierre LaFitte, the mid-90s WWF wrestler who was billed as a descendant of the pirate Jean LaFitte

See also 

 Jean (male given name)
 John (given name)
 Pierre
 Peter (given name)

Compound given names
French masculine given names